is a private university in Miyama, Fukuoka, Japan. The school was established in 2008.

External links
 Official website 

Educational institutions established in 2008
Private universities and colleges in Japan
Universities and colleges in Fukuoka Prefecture
2008 establishments in Japan